Devil's Workshop is the second of a pair of albums by Frank Black and the Catholics to be simultaneously released on August 20, 2002 (along with Black Letter Days).  "His Kingly Cave" was originally recorded for an aborted album project in mid-2000 entitled Sunday Sunny Mill Valley Groove Day. "Velvety"'s music comes from an earlier Pixies B-side, appropriately named "Velvety Instrumental Version".  The track first received lyrics when it was revived for this album.

Background
In 2002, Frank Black talked to the Free Williamsburg website about some of the songs on Devil's Workshop. "Velvety" was written by Black as a teenager and was called "Velvety Instrumental Version" because at the time he thought it sounded like the Velvet Underground, "which, of course, it doesn't, in hindsight," he said. "We had started to play it when we were touring on Dog in the Sand, just the instrumental version. It was a loud, open the set, "Hello! We're here!" kind of rave-up. It was kind of around. One day I had a session, and I didn't have a new song to present to the band and I said "Okay, I'm gonna write some lyrics to this song." As a matter of fact, that was the first thing we recorded for Devil's Workshop, I believe, on the first day."

"His Kingly Cave" is about a trip to Graceland many years before. Black: "I thought it would be fun to take hallucinogenic mushrooms while I was there. I was much younger than I am now. ... I went to Graceland with my girlfriend and we took mushrooms and it was a horrible and tense day. That's a telling of that day in that story."

Track listing
All tracks written by Frank Black.

 "Velvety" – 2:28
 "Out of State" – 2:29
 "His Kingly Cave" – 4:44
 "San Antonio, TX" – 3:43
 "Bartholomew" – 2:26
 "Modern Age" – 2:55
 "Are You Headed My Way?" – 2:03
 "Heloise" – 3:42
 "The Scene" – 2:29
 "Whiskey in Your Shoes" – 3:06
 "Fields of Marigold" – 3:05

Personnel
Frank Black and the Catholics
Frank Black – vocals, guitar
Scott Boutier – drums
David McCaffery – bass, vocals
Dave Philips – guitar, pedal steel guitar, vocals

Additional musicians
Joey Santiago – guitar
Lyle Workman – guitar
Moris Tepper – guitar
Rob Laufer – keyboards
Eric Drew Feldman – keyboards
Stan Ridgway – keyboards
Ben Mumphrey – maracas

Technical
Frank Black and the Catholics – producer
Ben Mumphrey – producer, engineer
Robert Vosgien – mastering
AlphaBeta – cover design

References

2002 albums
Frank Black and the Catholics albums
SpinART Records albums
Cooking Vinyl albums